The Cebu Gems also known as Cebuana Lhuillier Gems were a professional basketball team in the now-defunct Metropolitan Basketball Association from 1998 to 2002.
The team was owned by Jean Henri Lhuillier. The team played its home games at the Cebu Coliseum.

History

Cebu Gems (MBA seasons, 1998-2000)
The team owner was Jean Henri Lhuillier. The Gems had former national player Leoncio Tan, Jr as their first coach, he was replaced by former PBA player Tonichi Yturri during the inaugural season of the Metropolitan Basketball Association in 1998. Yturri would remain coach of the Cebu Gems until the final MBA season in 2002. Among the players who played for the Gems in their first season were Michael Manigo, a 5-7 guard out of Cebu Doctors College, Dondon Hontiveros, who won the MBA Discovery of the year award. Fil-Am Rob Wainwright, Rob Duat, Chris Tan, Chris Mendoza, Jan Montalbo Stephen Padilla and ex-pro Rudy Enterina. Their home games were held at the well-known Cebu Coliseum. The Gems were able to take the Negros Slashers to a seventh game in the Southern Conference finals before finally losing.

The following year in 1999, the Gems added the likes of Homer Se and Edwin Manabat  to the lineup. They lost to Iloilo Megavoltz for the Visayas division title.  But with the acquisition of Fil-Americans Matt Mitchell and Kenny Evans, the Gems made it to the national finals later that year against the Manila Metrostars. Cebu lost in six games to Manila in the best-of-seven series for the MBA national championship. 

In 2000, the Gems finished on top of the Southern Conference with 10 wins and two losses. They lost to Negros Slashers, three games to one, in the best-of-five finals for the Southern Conference title.

Cebuana Lhuillier (2001-2002 MBA seasons)
The team was now known as Cebuana Lhuillier Gems. In the first phase of the 2001 MBA season, the Gems finished the eliminations with 10 wins and four losses and are tied in the same standing with Andok's-San Juan Knights and Negros Slashers. They lost to Negros via two-game sweep in the best-of-three semifinal series.  They lost again to Negros, this time in five games for the Southern Conference title in the MBA second phase tournament that season.

Home Arenas
Cebu Coliseum (1998-2002)

1999 Roster

Other notable players
Rob Duat
Chris Mendoza
Rudy Enterina
Matt Mitchell
Kenny Evans
Chris de Jesus
Roy Lura 
Marc Pingris

References

Metropolitan Basketball Association teams
Basketball teams established in 1998
Basketball teams disestablished in 2002
Sports in Cebu
1998 establishments in the Philippines
2002 disestablishments in the Philippines